Pisaflores Tepehua is a Tepehua language of Veracruz, Mexico. It is spoken in the towns of Ixhuatlán de Madero and Pisaflores.

Phonology

Consonants

Vowels

Phonotactics
Pisaflores Tepehua syllable structure is summarized by MacKay and Treschel (2013) as:

 C (C) V (C (C))

That is, Pisaflores Tepehua syllables must start with a consonant or two-consonant cluster, have one vowel sound, and may end without consonants or with a consonant or two-consonant cluster.

Phonological restrictions apply:

 Onset
 C can be any consonant
 C can only exist if and only if C is a fricative (/s/, /ɕ/, /ɬ/)
 C cannot be a fricative or affricate (/s/, /ɕ/, /ɬ/, /ts/, /tɕ/, /tsʼ/, /tɕʼ/)
 If C = /ɬ/, then C cannot be a lateral (/ɬ/, /l/)

 Nucleus
 V can be any vowel, long or short

 Coda
 C can be any consonant that is not an affricate (/ts/, /tɕ/, /tsʼ/, /tɕʼ/)
 C can be a bilabial stop (/p/, /pʼ/) in syllable-final positions, but never in word-final positions
 C can only exist if and only if C = /k/ or C = /ʔ/
 C can only be /s/, /ɕ/, or /ɬ/ if C = /k/
 C can only be /s/ or /ɕ/ if C = /ʔ/

References

External links 

 Collections in the Archive of the Indigenous Languages of Latin America.

Totonacan languages

 

Languages of Mexico